Waka is an Adamawa language of Nigeria.

References

Languages of Nigeria
Mumuye–Yendang languages